
Boro may refer to:

People
 Boro people, indigenous peoples of Amazonas, Brazil
 A variant spelling for the Bodo people of northeast India
 Charan Boro, Indian politician
 Isaac Adaka Boro, a celebrated Niger Delta nationalist and Nigerian civil war hero
 Sadun Boro (1928–2015), first Turkish global circumnavigator

Places
 Boro, New South Wales, a locality in Australia
 Boro, Burkina Faso, a town in Burkina Faso
 Boro, Togo is a village is the Kara region of Togo
 A local nickname for the English town Middlesbrough and its football team Middlesbrough F.C.
 Boro, Nigeria
 Boro (River Boro), a distributary of River Slaney
 Birsk, a town in Bashkortostan, Russia, known as Бөрө (Börö) in Bashkir
 Boro, Purulia, a village, with a police station, in Purulia district, West Bengal, India

Sporting
 Boro (Formula One), a Dutch Formula One constructor
"Boro" association football club nicknames, based in northern England:
Middlesbrough FC
Scarborough Athletic
Defunct Scarborough FC
Radcliffe F.C.

Other
 Boro (textile), a class of Japanese textiles that have been mended or patched together
 The BORO approach, a process for developing formal ontologies
 Boro rice, an ecotype of rice used for the spring dry-season crop
 Boro, short for borosilicate glass

See also
 Borro, a UK based personal asset finance company
 Borough
Boros (disambiguation)